Oru na Nneude (alternately Oru na Lude) is a village in Ahiara, Imo State, Nigeria. It is divided into two sections, Oru and Nneude, the division between which was apparent as early as the late 1950s. The population of Oru is over 5,200, and Lude over 4,700.

Oru
The Oru section has the hamlets of Amaawa, Ebo na Ikuku, Owasi Njoku, Umudim Igwe, Umuidi, Umuiroaku, Umuiwe, Umumkpade, Umuogologo, Umuokorocha, Ogbor, Umuibeleche and Umuosi. Six of these hamlets - Owasi Njoku, Umudim Igwe, Umumkpade, Ogbor, Umuibeleche and Umuogologo - are collectively called Oru Ama. The village market, Afo Oru, is one of the largest in Igboland, occurring on the Afo day of the eight-day Igbo calendar.

The Eze of Oru is Eze Joe Oleka.

Nneude
The Nneude section has seven hamlets, namely: Nneude Ama, Umuezeala, Umuloghocha, Umunwaaja, Umuokoro, Umuoriaku, and Umuukpo. The market is called Nkwo Lude.

The Eze of Nneude is Igwe J. S. Anyamele. He is titled the Ude I of Nneude Ahiara.

References

Towns in Imo State
Villages in Igboland